Antonino (Nino) Letteriello (born August 11, 1979, in Italy) is the first President of the Data Association Management Italy Chapter and European Coordinator for the International Data Association Management.

Letteriello started his career in the public transport industry in 2006, working for transport networks including Metropolitana Milanese and Transport for London before assuming the role of Head of Programme Management for the London 2012 Olympic and Paralympic Games. He was invited to the UK Olympic Expert Panel by then President of London 2012 Lord Coe.

He founded Enne Limited in 2014 and is also founder and CEO of FIT Strategy. Since 2020, Letteriello has been a member of the Massachusetts Institute of Technology's CDO Symposium Programme Committee and in 2021 was nominated High Level Facilitator Tracker for policy on building confidence and security in the use of ICTs. 
Holder of a Data Management Excellence Award, in 2021, Letteriello was nominated as one of the DataIq 100 most influential people in data. He lives in Modena with his wife Renata.

References

1979 births
Living people
Data scientists